The Panasonic Lumix DMC-G5 is a digital mirrorless interchangeable lens camera adhering to the joint Olympus and Panasonic Micro Four Thirds System (MFT system) design standard. It is identified as the twelfth Panasonic MFT camera introduced under the standard and the nineteenth model MFT camera introduced by either Olympus or Panasonic.

The G5 includes HD video recording capability in AVCHD format. The G5 is the successor to the Panasonic Lumix DMC-G3, and is Panasonic's most junior MFT camera.

The G5 differs from the G3 principally by offering a higher maximum ISO (12,800 vs 6,400), a continuous shooting frame rate (6 vs 4 fps), a higher resolution screen and a new image sensor and processor.

Physically, the G5 is very similar to the Panasonic Lumix DMC-G3, but it has a larger hand grip. However, most camera functionality is also accessible through the touch-control LCD panel.

References

External links 

 Panasonic Lumix DMC-G5 Product Page
Panasonic Lumix G5 preview at cameralabs.com
Panasonic Lumix DMC-G5 Preview – dpreview.com
Panasonic Lumix G5 Review at photographyblog.com
Panasonic Lumix G5 review at pocket-lint.com

G5